Silent Hunter II is a World War II U-boat combat simulation published by Ubi Soft for PCs with Windows 95/98/ME.

Gameplay 
Silent Hunter II gives the player the command of a German U-boat during the Second Battle of the Atlantic. The game offers single-player and multiplayer missions.

German World War II veteran and sub commander Erich Topp was one of the game's technical advisers, and a series of interviews with him appears in the game.

Silent Hunter II was developed with multi-player support as a notable feature. Players were able to connect with other Silent Hunter II players, and engage in sub vs. sub combat. Furthermore, connectivity to the separate game Destroyer Command (also released by Ubisoft) was available, which enabled sub and surface ship combat.

History 
Silent Hunter II  was originally being developed by Aeon Electronic Entertainment, the developers of Silent Hunter, but they had to leave the project unfinished, and Ultimation Inc. finished it. After considerable delays it was released in November 2001 after three years of work.

After release, instability with the multiplayer feature was found to be commonplace, yet Ubisoft never resolved this issue by releasing another official patch. While in 2002 Ubisoft had ended the official support, they authorized and enabled the game's community at Subsim.com to fix the game themselves by giving them the source code. The fan community raised over $7000 for an unofficial patch development project called Projekt Messerwetzer which ultimately fixed the issues. Since then, unofficial expansion packs like the World War II Pacific war theatre-based total conversation "Pacific Aces" were released by community.

In June 2009, after many years of commercial non-availability, the game got re-released on the digital distributor gog.com.

Reception 

Silent Hunter II received "average" reviews according to video game review aggregator Metacritic. A Subsim review rated Silent Hunter II 80/100 in 2005 and named it "the new WWII subsim benchmark".

See also 
Silent Hunter, released in 1996
Silent Hunter III, released in 2005
Silent Hunter 4, released in 2007
Silent Hunter 5, released in 2010

References

External links 
Official website 

Projekt Messerwetzer An authorized community upgrade for Silent Hunter II and Destroyer Command

2001 video games
Multiplayer and single-player video games
Naval video games
Strategic Simulations games
Submarine simulation video games
Ubisoft games
Video games developed in the United States
Video games scored by Kevin Manthei
Windows games
Windows-only games
World War II video games